The Israel Studies Review is a peer-reviewed academic journal published on behalf of the Association for Israel Studies by Berghahn Books and covering the study of all aspects of society, history, politics, and culture of Israel. The journal was previously known as the Israel Studies Bulletin from 1992 to 2001 and as the Israel Studies Forum from 2001 to 2010. The editors of the journal since summer 2021 are Oded Haklai (Queen's University, Ontario, Canada) and Adia Mendelson-Maoz (The Open University of Israel, Israel).  Rami Zeedan (University of Kansas, Kansas, USA) is the journal's book review editor.

Abstracting and indexing 
The journal is abstracted and indexed in:

References

External links 
 

English-language journals
Berghahn Books academic journals
Biannual journals
Publications established in 1986
Middle Eastern studies journals
Academic journals associated with learned and professional societies
Israel studies